The "Aquino Government" or "Aquino government" may refer to either of these two presidencies of the Philippines:
 the presidency of Corazon Aquino, or
 the presidency of Benigno Aquino III